Leucopogon crassiflorus is a species of flowering plant in the heath family Ericaceae and is endemic to the south-west of Western Australia. The flowers are borne singly or in pairs in upper leaf axils on a short peduncle, sometimes in small clusters, and with small bracts and bracteoles at the base.

The species was first formally described in 1868 by Ferdinand von Mueller who gave it the name Styphelia crassiflorus in Fragmenta Phytographiae Australiae. In 1868, George Bentham changed the name to Leucopogon crassiflorus in Flora Australiensis.
The specific epithet (crassiflorus) means "thick-flowered".Leucopogon crassiflorus occurs in the Avon Wheatbelt and Geraldton Sandplains bioregions of south-western Western Australia and is listed (as Styphelia crassiflora'') as "not threatened" by the Government of Western Australia Department of Biodiversity, Conservation and Attractions.

References

crassiflorus
Ericales of Australia
Flora of Western Australia
Plants described in 1868
Taxa named by George Bentham